Emilie Norton Martin (30 December 1869 – 8 February 1936) was an American mathematician and professor of mathematics at Mount Holyoke College.

Life
Martin earned her bachelor's degree at Bryn Mawr College in 1894 majoring in mathematics and Latin.  She continued her graduate studies at Bryn Mawr under the supervision of Charlotte Scott. In 1897-1898 she used a Mary E. Garrett Fellowship from Bryn Mawr to study at the University of Göttingen.  In Göttingen, Martin and Virginia Ragsdale attended lectures by Felix Klein and David Hilbert. Although her name and dissertation title were printed in the 1899 commencement program, her Ph.D. wasn't granted until 1901 when her dissertation was published.

In 1903 she became an instructor at Mount Holyoke College.  She was later promoted to associate professor and then professor.  Although she had earned a doctorate, it did not hasten her promotion to professor. She spent eight years as an instructor and fifteen as an associate professor.  This was common for women of her time, who were often unable to pass the associate professorship.  Martin's research focused on primitive substitution groups of degree 15 and primitive substitution groups of degree 18.  In 1904 she published the index to the first ten volumes of the Bulletin of the American Mathematical Society.

Martin was a member of the American Association for the Advancement of Science, the American Mathematical Society, and the Mathematical Association of America.

References

External links
Emilie Martin on the Mathematics Genealogy Project
Relating To Required Mathematics For Women Students by Emilie Martin for the American Mathematical Monthly

1869 births
1936 deaths
American women mathematicians
19th-century American mathematicians
20th-century American mathematicians
20th-century women mathematicians
20th-century American women
Mount Holyoke College faculty
19th-century American women educators
Bryn Mawr College alumni
Mathematicians from New Jersey
People from Elizabeth, New Jersey